David J. Halberstam (born October 7, 1951) was the EVP/General Manager of Westwood One Sports. Previously, he was the play-by-play announcer for the Miami Heat and St. John's basketball.

In 1999, Halberstam published Sports on New York Radio: A Play-by-Play History. In 2016, he authored "The Fundamentals of Sports Media and Sponsorship Sales: Developing New Accounts." In early 2018, Halberstam launched the website, Sports Broadcast Journal; which evaluates the work of sports broadcasters and covers the sports media world.

In the 2011 season, Halberstam joined the Nova Southeastern University Sharks Athletics family as its Men's Basketball play-by-play announcer. He left NSU in 2019.

Halberstam now voluntarily runs a publication about sports broadcasting Sports Broadcast Journal.

References

External links 
David J. Halberstam via Westwood One Sports

1951 births
Living people
Sports commentators
Miami Heat announcers